Izi may refer to:

People and language
Izzi people, an ethnic group of Nigeria
Izi language, an Igbo language of Nigeria
Igboid languages, ISO 939-3 language code izi
Izi (Ancient Egyptian official)
Izi (rapper) (born 1995), Italian rapper and actor
Izi Castro Marques (born 1982), Brazilian basketball player
Izi Dorot (1916–1980), Israeli military official
Igor Ivanov Izi (born 1973), Macedonian film director

Places
Izi, North Khorasan, Iran
Izi, Razavi Khorasan, Iran

Other uses
 Izi mobil (Bosnia and Herzegovina), a mobile communications brand

See also 

 Izzi (disambiguation)
 Easy (disambiguation)
 IZY, a train service between Brussels and Paris

Language and nationality disambiguation pages